Steve Hindalong (born November 29, 1959) is an American drummer, percussionist, songwriter and producer best known for his work with the alternative rock band the Choir. Since 2006, Hindalong has also been an official member of the alternative country supergroup Lost Dogs.

After becoming a prolific producer in the late 1990s, Hindalong received several Dove awards (2001 and 2003, "Special Event Album of the Year") for his work on the City on a Hill project. Hindalong also co-wrote "God of Wonders" with Marc Byrd, which was used by NASA to wake up Discovery astronaut Michael Fossum.

Discography

The Choir
 Shades of Gray  (1986) – Producer, Songwriter, Drums, Percussion
 Diamonds and Rain (1986) – Songwriter, Drums, Percussion
 Chase the Kangaroo (1987) – Producer, Songwriter, Drums
 Wide-Eyed Wonder (1989) – Producer, Songwriter, Drums
 Circle Slide (1990) – Producer, Songwriter, Drums
 Kissers and Killers (1993) – Producer, Songwriter, Drums, Percussion, Harmonica, Vocals
 Speckled Bird (1995) – Producer, Songwriter, Drums, Percussion, Backing Vocals
 Free Flying Soul (1996) – Producer, Songwriter, Drums, Percussion, Child's Piano, Kenyan Whistle, Vocals
 Flap Your Wings (2000) – Producer, Songwriter, Drums, Percussion
 Oh How the Mighty Have Fallen (2005) – Producer, Songwriter, Drums, Percussion
 Burning Like the Midnight Sun (2010) – Producer, Songwriter, Drums, Percussion
 "De-Plumed" (2011) – Producer, Songwriter, Drums, Percussion
 The Loudest Sound Ever Heard (2012) – Producer, Songwriter, Drums, Percussion
 Shadow Weaver (2014) – Producer, Songwriter, Drums, Percussion

Solo credits
 To Hell with the Devil (1996) Flying Tart
 Skinny (1998) Cadence Records, Reviews: HM Magazine, The Phantom Tollboth)
The Warbler (2016)

Performing credits
 Ideola – Tribal Opera, Mark Heard (1987) – Digital Sampling
 Briefing for the Ascent, Terry Scott Taylor (1987) – Drums
 Pain, Veil of Ashes (1989) – Background Vocals
 Big Big Town, Riki Michele (1989) – Songwriter, Cymbal Overdubs, Percussion, Harmonica, Acoustic Guitar, Jingly Stick
 Homeboys, Adam Again (1990) – Songwriter, Drums
 Dr. Edward Daniel Taylor: The Miracle Faith Telethon, Terry Scott Taylor (1990) – Drums
 At the Foot of the Cross -Volume 1- Clouds, Rain, Fire  (1991) – Producer, Songwriter, Drums, Percussion
 Second Hand, Mark Heard (1991) – Drums
 Holes in the Floor of Heaven, Ric Alba (1991) – Producer, Acoustic Guitar, Drums, Percussion
 Poplife, Lifesavers (1991) – Drums
 Just Keep Going On, Rev. Dan Smith (1992) – Percussion, Hand Claps
 The Embarrassing Young, John Austin (1992) – Producer, Drums, Percussion
 Grape Prophet, The, L.S.U. (1992) – Percussion, Voice of Grape Prophet
 Plague of Ethyls, Plague of Ethyls (1992) – Producer, Drums, Percussion
 Motorcycle, Daniel Amos (1993) – Drums, Percussion
 Orphans And Angels, Julie Miller (1993) – Percussion
 Brow Beat Unplugged Alternative  (1993) – Percussion
 Shawl, The Prayer Chain (1993) – Producer, Shaker, Tambourine, Harmonica
 Mindsize, Poor Old Lu (1993) – Percussion
 High Noon, Mark Heard (1994) – Drums
 Grace Shaker, L.S.U. (1994) – Cat Food Tin, Plastic Waste Receptacle
 Mercury, The Prayer Chain (1995) – Producer, Percussion, Vox Continental Organ
 Skywire, Common Children (1996) – Producer, Percussion, Toy Piano
 Antarctica, The Prayer Chain (1996) – Producer, Percussion
 All Star United, All Star United (1997) – Percussion
 Images of Faith, Marty McCall (1997) – Drums, Percussion
 Redemption, White Heart (1997) – Percussion
 Delicate Fade, Common Children (1997) – Producer, Percussion
 International Anthems for the Human Race, All Star United (1998) – Percussion
 Back From Nowhere, Polarboy (1998) – Percussion
 Starlight Wishlist", Glisten (1998) – Percussion
 Worldwide Favorites, Adam Again (1999) – Songwriter, Drums
 Transparent, Broomtree (1999) – Percussion
 Homeboys / Dig, Adam Again (2000) – Songwriter, Drums
 When Worlds Collide: A Tribute to Daniel Amos (2000) – Percussion
 Live in Nash-Vegas, Michael Knott (2000) – Percussion
 Live at Cornerstone 2000, Adam Again (2001) – Songwriter, Vocals
 Chasing the Horizon, Mitch McVicker (2001) – Percussion
 The Inbetween Time, Common Children (2001) – Percussion
 Random Acts & Hodgepodge, Terry Scott Taylor (2002) – Songwriter, Vocals
 Nazarene Crying Towel, Lost Dogs (2003) – Percussion
 Sound of Melodies, Leeland (2006) – Percussion
 R U Ready , Godfrey Birtill (2008) Percussion

Producing/songwriting credits
 Ten Songs by Adam Again, Adam Again (1988) – Songwriter
 Whirlpool EP, The Prayer Chain (1992) – Producer
 Shawl, The Prayer Chain (1993) – Producer
 Mercury, The Prayer Chain (1995) – Producer, Songwriter on "Bendy Line"
 Super Deluxe, Morella's Forest (1995) – Producer
 Skywire, Common Children (1996) – Producer
 The Violet Burning, The Violet Burning (1996) – Producer
 Grace and Dire Circumstances (cover of "Chase the Kangaroo"), Farewell to Juliet (1998) – Songwriter
 Water – Between Thieves (1998) – Producer
 Starlight Wishlist, Glisten (1998) – Producer
 In the Company of Angels, Caedmon's Call (2001) – Producer, Songwriter
 Invade My Soul, By The Tree (2002) – Producer
 Invisible Empires'', Sara Groves (2011) – Producer

References

1959 births
Living people
American rock drummers
Record producers from Tennessee
People from Nashville, Tennessee
American performers of Christian music
Place of birth missing (living people)
20th-century American drummers
American male drummers
The Choir (alternative rock band) members
Lost Dogs members
20th-century American male musicians